The Accreditation Council for Business Schools and Programs (ACBSP), formerly the Association of Collegiate Business Schools and Programs, is a U.S. organization offering accreditation services to business programs focused on teaching and learning.

Based in Overland Park, Kansas (a suburb of Kansas City), ACBSP was created to fulfill a need for specialized accreditation by colleges and universities with business schools and programs.

History 
ACBSP was founded in 1989 to accredit business schools with an emphasis on teaching and learning. At the time, only 260 out of 2,400 schools of business had specialized professional accreditation, all from the Association to Advance Collegiate Schools of Business (AACSB). Most or all of the AACSB accredited schools had an emphasis on research, while most other schools had an emphasis on teaching.  On April 28, 1988, 150 of the non-accredited schools met in Kansas City, Missouri, to consider alternatives to AACSB accreditation for teaching-oriented schools.

On May 12, 1989, a study group completed a feasibility study and submitted recommendations for standard for accreditation by the ACBSP.  In August 1992, ACBSP was recognized by the U.S. Department of Education as a specialized accreditation agency for business education.  In June 1994, a U.S. Department of Education Advisory Committee recommended withdrawal of recognition for the ACBSP due to a determination that ACBSP accreditation would not be a "required element" in making an institution eligible to participate in U.S. federal government programs under the Higher Education Act or other authorities. However, at its meeting on January 22, 2001, the Council for Higher Education Accreditation (CHEA) Board of Directors granted recognition to the ACBSP. On September 19, 2011 The CHEA renewed its recognition of the ACBSP for a further 10 years.

In June 2010, the ACBSP changed its name from Association of Collegiate Business Schools and Programs to Accreditation Council for Business Schools and Programs. The ACBSP accredits mostly business schools with traditional campus locations, but also accredits online business programs as well.

Membership 
As of August 2010, ACBSP reported having over 8,000 individual members and 828 member educational institutions, of which 529 had ACBSP accreditation and 220 had candidacy status. All but 134 member institutions are in the United States. In April 2013, ACBSP reported 1,171 member campuses, 183 of which are located outside of the U.S. Of those campuses, 586 have achieved accreditation and more than 500 are in candidacy for accreditation. Individual members on these campuses now exceed 10,000.

Affiliations 
ACBSP holds membership and/or recognition in the following networks:

 Universidad Argentina de la Empresa - UADE 
 Council for Higher Education Accreditation - CHEA  
 European Association for Quality Assurance in Higher Education (Affiliate Status) - ENQA 
 International Network for Quality Assurance Agencies in Higher Education - INQAAHE 
 Association of African Business Schools - AABS 
 Principles for Responsible Management Education - PRME 
 Consejo Latinoamericano de Escuelas de Administración - CLADEA 
 Russian Association of Business Education - RABE 
 Association of Indian Management Schools - AIMS 
 Global Management Challenge, USA 
 Enactus 
 Federation of Swiss Private Schools/Swiss Private School Register 
 ACBSP has recognized certification program standards which allow for certifications to be awarded to top ACBSP students who meet the exam and GPA requirements.
 Global Academy of Finance and Management(GAFM, previously AAFM) has agreement since 2004 with ACBSP to offer certifications to those who have completed ACBSP accredited business school courses, standards exams and programs.

Honor societies 
Through an agreement made in January 1992 between Delta Mu Delta and ACBSP, establishment of Delta Mu Delta chapters is now exclusively at colleges and universities with business programs which are accredited by ACBSP at the baccalaureate/graduate levels. Delta Mu Delta was founded in 1913 by the Dean from Harvard University and four professors from Yale University and New York University to recognize students in accredited business schools for their high academic achievement in baccalaureate, masters and doctorate programs. The ACBSP also recognizes the Kappa Beta Delta business honor society  and the Sigma Beta Delta business honor society. Membership in the honor societies is also available to online students who are attending ACBSP accredited programs.

Employer recognition 
In 2006, Intel announced that it would no longer provide tuition reimbursement for employees to attend business schools with accreditation from ACBSP, which accredited several for-profit universities. Instead they will only be accepting AACSB accredited courses. At the same time the company imposed a similar restriction on reimbursements for engineering programs. The company explained that the policy change was intended to make the program more cost-effective to the company, noting that employees had been receiving reimbursement for programs "that were not of the highest value to the company" or left Intel after finishing programs that did not advance their careers there. This was perhaps an indirect criticism of the University of Phoenix and other rapidly growing for-profit colleges that seemed unstable; with many rotating part-time instructors and over many locations nationwide.

References

External links 
 

Business schools
Management education
School accreditors
International college and university associations and consortia